Vitaly Sevostyanik (born 1 August 1980 in Grodno) is a Belarusian professional football referee. He has officiated matches of the Belarusian Premier League since 2007. 

Sevostyanik was on a FIFA International Referees List between 2009 and 2012.

References

External links
 
 

Belarusian football referees
1980 births
Living people